Bjorn Seguin (born 4 April 1990) is an American male badminton player. In 2014, he won silver medals at the Pan Am Badminton Championships in men's singles and mixed team events.

Achievements

Pan Am Championships
Men's singles

BWF International Challenge/Series
Men's singles

Men's doubles

Mixed doubles

 BWF International Challenge tournament
 BWF International Series tournament
 BWF Future Series tournament

References

External links
 

1990 births
Living people
Sportspeople from Los Angeles
American male badminton players
Badminton players at the 2015 Pan American Games
New Zealand male badminton players
Pan American Games competitors for the United States